The Catalan Basketball League, more commonly known as Lliga Catalana, is the regional preseason professional basketball competition that has been organized by the Catalan Basketball Federation since 1980, in Catalonia, Spain.

Nowadays, only teams that play in ACB (Spanish 1st Division) join the competition.

Performance by club

Lliga Catalana History

See also
LEB Catalan basketball league
Catalan basketball derby

External links
 Catalan Basketball Federation website

 
Basketball in Catalonia
Basketball cup competitions in Spain